The 1979 Nations Cup, also known by its sponsored name Ambre Solaire Nations Cup, was a men's team tennis tournament played on outdoor clay courts. It was the third edition of the World Team Cup and was part of the 1979 Grand Prix circuit. It took place at the Rochusclub in Düsseldorf in Germany from 7 May through 14 May 1979. Total prize money was $250,000 and in total 44,500 people attended the event. Spain were the defending champions but did not compete that year. Australia defeated Italy in the final, which was delayed by one day due to rain, to win the title for the first time.

The draw consisted of eight teams divided over two round-robin groups. The two best ranked teams from each group proceeded to the semifinals. Each match consisted of two singles and a doubles.

Players

Section A

Ricardo Cano
José Luis Clerc 

Mark Cox
John Lloyd
Buster Mottram

Corrado Barazzutti
Paolo Bertolucci
Adriano Panatta

José Higueras
Manuel Orantes

Section B

John Alexander
Phil Dent
Kevin Warwick

 Rolf Gehring
 Uli Pinner
 Andreas Maurer
 Werner Zirngibl

Marcello Lara
Emilio Montano
Raúl Ramírez

Arthur Ashe
Eddie Dibbs
Stan Smith
Harold Solomon

Round robin

Section A

Standings

Italy vs. Spain

Argentina vs. Great Britain

Spain vs. Great Britain

Italy vs. Argentina

Italy vs. Great Britain

Argentina vs. Spain

Section B

Standings

Australia vs. Germany

USA vs. Mexico

Australia vs. USA

Germany vs. Mexico

USA vs. Germany

Australia vs. Mexico

Semifinal

Australia vs. Argentina

Italy vs. USA

Final

Australia vs. Italy

See also
 1979 Davis Cup

External links
 1979 Nations Cup Results itftennis.com

References

Nations Cup
Nations Cup
World Team Cup